The Studio Graton, or Studio Jean Graton is a drawing studio that helped French cartoonist Jean Graton draw various comics series, among them the famous series Michel Vaillant.

History
In 1962, Jean Graton hires an assistant, the young Christian Denayer, to help him with the drawing of the sets and cars and the colorization of the Michel Vaillant plates. After eight years of collaboration, Denayer left to work for Tibet and what was already the embryo of the Graton Studio was expanded to include Daniel Bouchez and Christian Lippens. 

The studio was created by Jean Graton in the mid 1980s, contributing to several albums. It was made up of various drawers. In the 1990, a new generation of artists came, and the studio was in charge of all the drawings when Jean Graton withdrawn in 2003. It is now led by Philippe Graton, the son of Jean Graton, who has designed the scenarios of the series since the 1994.

Publications
Michel Vaillant
Les dossiers Michel vaillant

List of current artists
Christian Papazoglakis
Nedzad Kamenica
Robert Paquet

References

External links
Official website

Artist-run centres
Comics studios
Michel Vaillant